The 1996 North Texas Mean Green football team represented the University of North Texas in the 1996 NCAA Division I-A football season. The Mean Green played their home games at the Fouts Field in Denton, Texas, and competed in the Big West Conference. They were led by third-year head coach Matt Simon. The team finished the regular season with a 5-6 overall record with a 3-2 mark in Big West play.

Return to a Division I-A conference
The 1996 campaign marked the first time North Texas had been in a Division I-A conference since leaving the Missouri Valley Conference after the 1974 season. The Mean Green had competed as a Division I-A independent from 1975-1982, before dropping down to the Division I-AA Southland Conference from 1983-1994. North Texas spent the 1995 season as a transitional Division I-A member and thus competed as an Independent.

Schedule

Roster

References

North Texas
North Texas Mean Green football seasons
North Texas Mean Green football